An election to North Yorkshire County Council took place on 2 May 2013 as part of the 2013 United Kingdom local elections. 72 councillors were elected from 68 electoral divisions, which returned either one or two county councillors each by first-past-the-post voting for a four-year term of office. The four divisions which elected two members were Harrogate Bilton & Nidd Gorge, Harrogate Central, Knaresborough, and Selby Barlby. Of those seats UKIP won its first ever seats on the council in Bilton and Nidd Gorge. The electoral divisions were the same as those used at the previous election in 2009. The election saw the Conservative Party maintain overall control of the council.

All locally registered electors (British, Irish, Commonwealth and European Union citizens) who were aged 18 or over on Thursday 2 May 2013 were entitled to vote in the local elections. Those who were temporarily away from their ordinary address (for example, away working, on holiday, in student accommodation or in hospital) were also entitled to vote in the local elections, although those who had moved abroad and registered as overseas electors cannot vote in the local elections. It is possible to register to vote at more than one address (such as a university student who had a term-time address and lives at home during holidays) at the discretion of the local Electoral Register Office, but it remains an offence to vote more than once in the same local government election.

Results

|}

Divisional results

Craven district

Hambleton district

Harrogate district
 

Cllr John Savage was the Incumbent Councillor, however left the Conservative Party in 2010, before then joining the Liberal Party. Savage's vote share change is shown with that of the Liberal Party in the last election, who did not stand in said election.

Richmondshire district

Ryedale district

Scarborough district

Selby district

Notes

References

2013 English local elections
2013
2010s in North Yorkshire